The Infernal is a 1997 horror/fantasy novel by Kim Wilkins. It follows the story of musician whose fans keep turning up dead and who is having memories that don't belong to her.

Background
The Infernal was first published in Australia in 1997 by Random House in paperback format. It was later released in Germany, United Kingdom and France in 1999 and 2002. The Infernal won the 1997 Aurealis Award for best fantasy novel and best horror novel. In 2010 a limited hardcover edition was published by Ticonderoga Publications.

References

External links

1997 Australian novels
Australian fantasy novels
Australian horror novels
Aurealis Award-winning works